Mount Rucker is a mountain, immediately south of Johns Hopkins Ridge in the Royal Society Range of Victoria Land. Discovered by the Discovery Expedition (1901–04) which named it for Sir Arthur Rucker, Honorary Secretary of the Royal Society.

Descending east from the mountain, Rucker Ridge forms the divide between Radian Glacier and Walcott Glacier. It was named after Mount Rucker by the New Zealand Victoria University of Wellington Antarctic Expedition (VUWAE), 1960–61.

Sulphide Pass is a saddle that forms a mountain pass on Rucker Ridge in Antarctica. Its name comes from an exposed band of pyritized shale which gives off a sulphurous smell when struck by an instrument such as a hammer.

References 

Mountains of Victoria Land
Scott Coast